Saint Augustine's Prayer Book is an Anglo-Catholic devotional book published for members of the various Anglican churches in the United States and Canada by the Order of the Holy Cross, an Anglican monastic community. 
 
The first edition, edited by Loren N. Gavitt, was published in 1947. Now in the eighteenth printing of the 1967 revised edition, it remains popular among High Church Anglicans in North America. It is used as a companion to the Book of Common Prayer (American editions of 1928 and 1979). In addition to various prayers and devotions, it includes the order of Mass according to the Anglican Missal, with the Prayer Book Canon of the Mass.

The original 1947 edition was republished in 1998 as Traditional St. Augustine's Prayer Book by Preservation Press of Swedesboro, NJ.

In 2014 a Revised Edition was published by Forward Movement, edited by David Cobb and Derek Olsen, .

Contents of the 1967 edition
The Christian's Obligations: As to Worship, Fasting and Abstinence, and the Six Precepts
Common Forms of Prayer
Daily prayers
Various Prayers
Praise and Thanksgiving, including the Te Deum Laudamus
The Mass
Devotions for Holy Communion
Spiritual Communion
Sacrament of Penance
Benediction of the Blessed Sacrament
Devotions to the Blessed Sacrament
Stations of the Cross
Prayers in Sickness, and for the Sick
Prayers for the Dead
Requiem Mass, including an English version of the Dies irae
Devotions to the Trinity, including the Athanasian Creed
Devotions to the Holy Ghost
Devotions to the Sacred Heart of Jesus
Devotions to the Blessed Virgin Mary, including the Holy Rosary and Antiphons of the Blessed Virgin
Devotions to St. Joseph
Devotions to the Angels
Various Litanies
Novenas, including Novena to the Holy Ghost, with English version of Veni Creator Spiritus
Devotions for Christmas
Devotions to the Passion
Holy Hours

References

Sources 

 Saint Augustine's Prayer Book, Revised Edition, Rev. Loren Gavitt and Rev. Archie Drake, editors, Holy Cross Publications. (1967) Library of Congress Number: BV260.G3 1949

External links
Saint Augustine’s Prayer Book; a book of devotion for members of the Episcopal Church - Library of Congress Online Catalog
Holy Cross Monastery - Holy Cross Publishing
Self-Examination From Saint Augustine's Prayer Book
Sample of the 2014 Revised Edition

Anglo-Catholicism
Christian prayer books

Anglican liturgical books